Oh, Such a Night! (Swedish: O, en så'n natt!) It is a 1937 Swedish romantic comedy film directed by Anders Henrikson and starring Thor Modéen, Sickan Carlsson, Birgit Tengroth and Kirsten Heiberg. It was shot at the Råsunda Studios in Stockholm. The film's sets were designed by the art director Arne Åkermark. It is based on the 1924 German play Die vertagte Nacht by Franz Arnold and Ernst Bach, previously made into the 1936 British film The Interrupted Honeymoon and later into the 1953 West German release The Postponed Wedding Night.

Synopsis
When a couple head to Örebro to spend their wedding night, their honeymoon gets off to a bad start when the wife finds another woman in her husband's bed. A series of complications ensue.

Cast
 Thor Modéen as 	Adrian Berggren
 Sickan Carlsson as Irma Berggren
 Åke Söderblom as Efraim Zelin
 Birgit Tengroth as Edit Zelin, Efraim's Wife
 Kirsten Heiberg as Lola Kasaell
 Erik 'Bullen' Berglund as Julius Broberg 
 Allan Bohlin as 	Klas Hölling
 Elof Ahrle as 	Concierge
 Katie Rolfsen as 	Millan Karlgren
 Julia Cæsar as 	Ida Berggren
 Naemi Briese as	Cleaning-lady 
 Bror Bügler as 	Knutte 
 Aina Elkan as 	Miss Gustafsson 
 Birgit Essén as 	Anna, Berggren's Housemaid 
 Erik Forslund as Customer 
 Anders Henrikson as 	Pharmacist 
 Jullan Jonsson as Hanna, Efraim's Housemaid 
 Harald Wehlnor as 	Customer

References

Bibliography 
 Qvist, Per Olov & von Bagh, Peter. Guide to the Cinema of Sweden and Finland. Greenwood Publishing Group, 2000.

External links 
 

1937 films
Swedish comedy films
1937 comedy films
1930s Swedish-language films
Films directed by Anders Henrikson
Swedish black-and-white films
Swedish films based on plays
Remakes of British films
1930s Swedish films